Derbyshire County Cricket Club in 1976 was the cricket season when the English club Derbyshire had been playing for one hundred and five years. In the County Championship, they won four matches to finish fifteenth in their seventy-second season in the Championship. They came twelfth in the John Player League and reached the quarter-final of the Gillette Cup. They were eliminated at group level in the Benson & Hedges Cup.

1976 season

Derbyshire played twenty matches in the County Championship, one each against Oxford and Cambridge University and one against the touring West Indians. They won six first class matches overall but two of these were against the universities when Phil Sharpe clocked up a century and a double century. Derbyshire won seven and lost nine matches in the Sunday league.
  
Bob Taylor was in his second season as captain. Eddie Barlow was top scorer overall in the Championship and one competitions although Alan Hill was top scorer in the championship alone. Geoff Miller took most wickets.

Matches

First Class
{| class="wikitable" width="100%"
! bgcolor="#efefef" colspan=6 | List of matches
|- bgcolor="#efefef"
!No.
!Date
!V
!Result 
!Margin
!Notes
|- 
|1 
| 28 Apr 1976  
|  Sussex   Rutland Recreation Ground, Ilkeston 
|bgcolor="#FF0000"|Lost
| 5 wickets
|    AJ Borrington 102; G Miller 6-55; Greig 5-36; Waller 5-46 
|- 
|2
 |12 May 1976 
| Lancashire Old Trafford, Manchester 
|bgcolor="#FFCC00"|Drawn
|
|    Wood 101  
|- 
|3
| 19 May 1976
| Leicestershire Grace Road, Leicester 
|bgcolor="#FFCC00"|Drawn
|
|    Davison 106 
|- 
|4
 | 29 May 1976  
| Nottinghamshire  Rutland Recreation Ground, Ilkeston  
|bgcolor="#FFCC00"|Drawn
|
|    EJ Barlow 118; A Ward 5-66 
|- 
|5
|  2 Jun 1976
| Oxford University Cricket Club  The University Parks, Oxford 
|bgcolor="#00FF00"|Won 
| Innings and 53 runs
|    PJ Sharpe 228; FW Swarbrook 5-34
|- 
|6
 |12 Jun 1976  
| Leicestershire Queen's Park, Chesterfield  
|bgcolor="#FF0000"|Lost
| 7 wickets
|     
|- 
|7
 | 16 Jun 1976
| Yorkshire Abbeydale Park, Sheffield  
|bgcolor="#FFCC00"|Drawn
|
|    PE Russell 7-46 
|- 
|8
 |19 Jun 1976  
 | Essex   Castle Park Cricket Ground, Colchester
|bgcolor="#FF0000"|Lost
| Innings and 43 runs
|    Fletcher 114; Turner 5-33 
|- 
|9
 |23 Jun 1976
| Cambridge University Cricket Club  Bass Worthington Ground, Burton-on-Trent 
|bgcolor="#00FF00"|Won 
| Innings and 53 runs
|    PJ Sharpe 144; Bannister 5-50; G Miller 5-70
|- 
|10
 |30 Jun 1976
| Northamptonshire  Rutland Recreation Ground, Ilkeston 
|bgcolor="#FFCC00"|Drawn
|
|    Bedi 6-43; FW Swarbrook 6-29 
|- 
|11
 |3 Jul 1976
| West Indian cricket team in England in 1976  Queen's Park, Chesterfield
|bgcolor="#FF0000"|Lost
| 10 wickets
|    Rowe 152; Gomes 190; Padmore 6-101 
|- 
|12
 |7 Jul 1976 
| Warwickshire Courtaulds Ground, Coventry
|bgcolor="#FFCC00"|Drawn
|
|    Amiss 101 
|- 
|13
 |10 Jul 1976  
| SomersetQueen's Park, Chesterfield 
|bgcolor="#00FF00"|Won 
| 85 runs
|    K Stevenson 5-47; A Ward 6-52 
|- 
|14
 |21 Jul 1976   
| Kent  Crabble Athletic Ground, Dover 
|bgcolor="#FF0000"|Lost
| 62 runs
|    FW Swarbrook 6-54; Rowe 5-25 and 6-46; G Miller 7-74 
|- 
|15
 |24 Jul 1976  
| Glamorgan  Ind Coope Ground, Burton-on-Trent 
|bgcolor="#FF0000"|Lost
| 93 runs
|    M Hendrick 6-40; EJ Barlow 5-63; Nash 5-44 
|- 
|16
|28 Jul 1976 
|  Surrey  Rutland Recreation Ground, Ilkeston 
|bgcolor="#00FF00"|Won 
| 4 wickets
|    Roope 100; EJ Barlow 217; FW Swarbrook 5-66; G Miller 5-74 
|- 
|17
 |31 Jul 1976
| Yorkshire Queen's Park, Chesterfield  
|bgcolor="#FFCC00"|Drawn
|
|    A Hill 151; PJ Sharpe 126 
|- 
|18
 |7 Aug 1976
| Middlesex    Lord's Cricket Ground, St John's Wood 
|bgcolor="#FF0000"|Lost
| 106 runs
|    G Barlow 160; G Miller 6-130 and 6-88; Titmus 6-63 and 6-72
|- 
|19
 |14 Aug 1976
|  Worcestershire County Ground, New Road, Worcester 
|bgcolor="#FF0000"|Lost
| 18 runs
|    D'Oliveira 113; Gifford 5-71 
|- 
|20
 |21 Aug 1976
| Lancashire  Park Road Ground, Buxton 
|bgcolor="#00FF00"|Won 
| 15 runs
|    K Stevenson 5-47; Ratcliffe 5-46 
|- 
|21
| 28 Aug 1976
| Nottinghamshire  Trent Bridge, Nottingham 
|bgcolor="#FFCC00"|Drawn
|
|    PJ Sharpe 112; White 6-61 
|- 
|22
 |1 Sep 1976  
|  Gloucestershire  Phoenix County Ground, Bristol 
|bgcolor="#00FF00"|Won 
| 5 wickets
|    Mohammad 163 and 150; A Hill 126 
|- 
|23
 |8 Sep 1976 
| Hampshire Queen's Park, Chesterfield 
|bgcolor="#FFCC00"|Drawn
|
|    M Hendrick 6-56; Jesty 5-48 
|-

John Player League 
{| class="wikitable" width="70%"
! bgcolor="#efefef" colspan=6 | List of matches
|- bgcolor="#efefef"
!No.
!Date
!V
!Result 
!Margin
!Notes
  |- 
|1
| 25 Apr 1976  
 | Lancashire  Queen's Park, Chesterfield  
|bgcolor="#00FF00"|Won 
| 5 runs
|     
|- 
|2
 |2 May 1976  
| Hampshire Dean Park, Bournemouth 
|bgcolor="#FF0000"|Lost
| 7 wickets
|     
|- 
|3
|  23 May 1976  
| Nottinghamshire  Trent Bridge, Nottingham 
|bgcolor="#FF0000"|Lost
| 7 wickets
|     
|- 
|4
| 30 May 1976  
 | Essex   Rutland Recreation Ground, Ilkeston 
|bgcolor="#FF0000"|Lost
| 7 runs
|    A Ward 6-24 
|- 
|5
 | 6 Jun 1976  
 |  Surrey Kennington Oval  
|bgcolor="#FF0000"|Lost
| 6 wickets
|    Butcher 103 
|- 
|6
 |13 Jun 1976  
 |  Sussex  Trent College Ground, Long Eaton  
|bgcolor="#FF0000"|Lost
| 11 runs
|     
|- 
|7
| 27 Jun 1976  
| Leicestershire Grace Road, Leicester 
|bgcolor="#00FF00"|Won 
| 66 runs
|     
|- 
|8
 |4 Jul 1976  
|  Gloucestershire  Phoenix County Ground, Bristol 
|bgcolor="#00FF00"|Won 
| 10 wickets (Run rate)
|    PE Russell 5-26 
|- 
|9
| 11 Jul 1976  
| Somerset Town Ground, Heanor  
|bgcolor="#FF0000"|Lost
| 6 wickets
|     
|- 
|10
| 18 Jul 1976  
| Kent  Cheriton Road Sports Ground, Folkestone  
|bgcolor="#FF0000"|Lost
| 48 runs
|     
|- 
|11
 |25 Jul 1976  
| Warwickshire  Queen's Park, Chesterfield  
|bgcolor="#FF0000"|Lost
| 3 wickets
|     
|- 
|12
 |1 Aug 1976  
| Yorkshire Queen's Park, Chesterfield  
|bgcolor="#00FF00"|Won 
| 7 wickets
|     
|- 
|13
 |8 Aug 1976  
| Middlesex    Lord's Cricket Ground, St John's Wood 
|bgcolor="#FF0000"|Lost
| 7 wickets
|     
|- 
|14
 |15 Aug 1976  
 | Glamorgan   St Helen's, Swansea
|bgcolor="#00FF00"|Won 
| 44 runs
|     
|- 
|15
 |29 Aug 1976  
 | Northamptonshire Park Road Ground, Buxton  
|bgcolor="#00FF00"|Won 
| 85 runs
|    A Hill 120; PE Russell 6-10 
|- 
|16
| 5 Sep 1976  
 |  Worcestershire Ind Coope Ground, Burton-on-Trent 
|bgcolor="#00FF00"|Won 
| 34 runs
|     
|-

Gillette Cup 
{| class="wikitable" width="70%"
! bgcolor="#efefef" colspan=6 | List of matches
|- bgcolor="#efefef"
!No.
!Date
!V
!Result 
!Margin
!Notes
 |- 
|1st Round
| 26 Jun 1976
  | LincolnshireRutland Recreation Ground, Ilkeston  
|bgcolor="#00FF00"|Won 
| 7 wickets
|     
 |- 
|2nd Round
| 14 Jul 1976
 |  Surrey Rutland Recreation Ground, Ilkeston 
|bgcolor="#00FF00"|Won 
| 67 runs
|     
 |- 
| Quarter Final
| 4 Aug 1976
| Hampshire County Ground, Southampton   
|bgcolor="#FF0000"|Lost
| 47 runs
|     
 |-

Benson and Hedges Cup
 {| class="wikitable" width="60%"
! bgcolor="#efefef" colspan=6 | List of matches
|- bgcolor="#efefef"
!No.
!Date
!V
!Result 
!Margin
!Notes
|-
| Group A 1
 |24 Apr 1976  
| Glamorgan  Queen's Park, Chesterfield 
|bgcolor="#00FF00"|Won
| 8 wickets
|    PJ Sharpe 111  
|- 
| Group A 2
 |3 May 1976  
| Hampshire County Ground, Southampton   
|bgcolor="#00FF00"|Won 
| 4 wickets
|     
|- 
| Group A 3
 | 8 May 1976  
|Warwickshire  Queen's Park, Chesterfield  
|bgcolor="#FF0000"|Lost
| 5 wickets
|     
|- 
| Group A 4
 |15 May 1976  
|   Lancashire  Trafalgar Road Ground, Southport 
|bgcolor="#FF0000"|Lost
| 52 runs
|    M Hendrick 5-30; Wood 5-12 
|-

Statistics

Competition batting averages

Competition bowling averages

Wicket Keeping
Bob Taylor 
County Championship Catches 47, Stumping 10
John Player League Catches 11, Stumping 4
Gillette Cup Catches 6, Stumping 2
Benson and Hedges Cup Catches 7, Stumping 1

See also
Derbyshire County Cricket Club seasons
1976 English cricket season

References

1976 in English cricket
Derbyshire County Cricket Club seasons